Champaknagar Union is a small city near Bijoynagar Upazila. This is the biggest and oldest city in this upazila.

Administration
Champaknagar has 9 wards, 22 mouzas/mahallas. The most well known educational institute of Bijoynagar is located at Champaknagar name Champaknagar Model School And College .

References

Unions of Bijoynagar Upazila